Kraig Kann (born on May 3, 1966 in LaGrange, Illinois) is a former on-air personality on Golf Channel, former chief communications officer of the LPGA, and current  Managing Director of Kann Advisory Group and Host on SiriusXM PGA TOUR Radio.

Golf Channel
Kann was one of Golf Channel’s original on-air personalities Golf Channel from its founding in 1995 until his announced resignation on August 17 2011 to assume an administrative position at the LPGA. While at Golf Channel, he was involved in a variety of broadcast positions, including Golf Central, Golf Central Pre-Game and as a play-by-play announcer for PGA Tour, LPGA, and Nationwide Tour coverage. He also reported on-site for the station's coverage of The Masters, the U.S. Open, the Open Championship, the PGA Championship, and the Ryder Cup.

Prior broadcasting career
Kann is a 1988 graduate of the University of Missouri. Prior to joining Golf Channel, Kann  spent time in  Kalamazoo, Michigan, Fort Myers, Columbus, Georgia, and Columbia, Missouri.

Personal life
Kann has three children.

References

External links 
Kann's bio from The Golf Channel website

People from Columbia, Missouri
University of Missouri alumni
Living people
1966 births